Didier Flamand (born 12 March 1947) is a French actor and theatre director. He has appeared in more than 200 films and television shows since 1973. He starred in Raúl Ruiz's 1978 film The Suspended Vocation.

Theater

Filmography

Actor

Director

References

External links

1947 births
Living people
French male film actors
French male television actors
French male stage actors
20th-century French male actors
21st-century French male actors
French theatre directors